Mother and Son is a 1931 talking Pre code film directed by John P. McCarthy and starring screen veteran Clara Kimball Young. It was distributed by Monogram Pictures.

Cast
Clara Kimball Young - Faro Lil Payton
Bruce Warren - Jeff Payton
John Elliot - Mr. Winfield
Mildred Golden - Maureen Winfield
Gordon De Main - Joe Connors (*as G. D. Wood
Ernest Hilliard - Jameson
Si Jenks - Faro Dealer (*as Steamboat Simon Curran)
Thomas A. Curran - A Broker
Cheyenne Mussellman - A Barber

References

External links

DVD(Alpha)

1931 films
Monogram Pictures films
1931 drama films
American black-and-white films
1930s English-language films
Films directed by John P. McCarthy
1930s American films